, known as , is a Japanese pop singer-songwriter, originating from Yamato, Kanagawa Prefecture.

Biography  
Her debut release was the 1978 Oribia o Kikinagara (While Listening to Olivia), written by Amii Ozaki. Her song "Cat's Eye" was used as the first opening theme for the eponymous 1983 anime series Cat's Eye and debuted as No. 1 on Countdown Japan. It spent 4 weeks at No. 1 on the Oricon chart. It was one of the first J-pop songs used as an anime theme song. In 2017, she performed this song live at the opening of the touring ice show Fantasy on Ice amongst others.

Another one of her hits from 1983 was "Kanashimi ga Tomaranai" ("I Can't Stop the Loneliness"). Both songs appeared on the 1983 album Timely!!. She also appeared at the Red and White New Year's Music Special at the end of that same year, performing "Cat's Eye".

Other hit songs include Summer Candles and Dolphin Ring, both of which became standard songs played at Japanese weddings and receptions.  Throughout the 1980s and early 1990s, Anri's albums were bestsellers. She has had highly successful tours—one with an attendance of almost 100,000—and toured Hawaii for the first time in 1987. She sang the closing theme for the 1998 Winter Olympics at Nagano. In 2002, she began collaborating with jazz fusion guitarist Lee Ritenour, who produced her 2002 LP Smooth Jam – Quiet Storm.

With the renewed popularity of city pop, and her songs having been sampled by many new artists of the vaporwave and future funk genres, Anri has also enjoyed new popularity outside of Japan.

Discography 
Live Concerts

Albums

Compilations

References

External links 
 
  Official Website.

1961 births
Japanese women pop singers
Japanese women singer-songwriters
Japanese singer-songwriters
Living people
People from Yamato, Kanagawa
Musicians from Kanagawa Prefecture
Anime singers
Fantasy on Ice guest artists
20th-century Japanese women singers
20th-century Japanese singers
21st-century Japanese women singers
21st-century Japanese singers